Escape Me Never is a 1934 play written by Margaret Kennedy based upon her 1930 novel The Fool of the Family.

Set in pre World War I Europe, it tells the story of two brothers (Caryl and Sebastian Durbok) who are composers, share a flat, and are both in love with two women—an heiress and a young innocent.

The original West End run of the play at the Apollo Theatre starred Elisabeth Bergner for whom the play was written. Bergner, in her Broadway debut, starred also in the play's 1935 production at the Shubert Theatre.

Adaptations

The play was adapted into a British film in 1935 starring Bergner and directed by Paul Czinner, and into an American film in 1947 starring Ida Lupino, directed by Peter Godfrey.

References

External links
 
 

1934 plays
Films directed by Paul Czinner
British plays adapted into films
Broadway plays
West End plays
Plays by Margaret Kennedy
Plays based on novels